The year 1993 is the 1st year in the history of the Ultimate Fighting Championship (UFC), a mixed martial arts promotion based in the United States. 1993 had only 1 UFC event, UFC 1.

Debut UFC fighters

Given that this is the UFC's debut year, all fighters are also participating in their debut UFC fight.

Art Jimmerson
Gerard Gordeau
Jason DeLucia
Ken Shamrock

Kevin Rosier
Patrick Smith
Royce Gracie
Teila Tuli

Trent Jenkins
Zane Frazier

Events list

See also
 List of UFC champions
 List of UFC events

References

Ultimate Fighting Championship by year
1993 in mixed martial arts